The Hefei–Nanjing railway also known as the Hening railway is a railway line in China, running from Hefei to Nanjing at . High-speed trains on the line reduced travel time between Nanjing and Hefei from over three hours to 1.5 hours. The Hening Line forms part of the higher-speed Shanghai–Wuhan–Chengdu passenger railway from Shanghai to Chengdu and the easternmost section of the Nanjing–Xi'an Railway. The faster Shanghai–Chongqing–Chengdu high-speed railway is under construction, including the parallel Shanghai–Suzhou–Huzhou high-speed railway (due for completion in 2023) and the Hefei South–Huzhou section of the Shangqiu–Hangzhou high-speed railway (completed in 2020).

References

High-speed railway lines in China
Railway lines opened in 2008
Rail transport in Jiangsu
Rail transport in Anhui
Standard gauge railways in China